Apollo Bay is a coastal town in southwestern Victoria, Australia. It is situated on the eastern side of Cape Otway, along the edge of the Barham River and on the Great Ocean Road, in the Colac Otway Shire.

Its population swells throughout the bustling holiday seasons and is considered a major tourist destination in Victoria. It is host to the annual Apollo Bay Seafood Festival, Winter Wild and the Great Ocean Road Running Festival. Off season, Apollo Bay is home to families and retirees alike.

In winter to spring, southern right whales come to the area mainly to breed, to bear their calves, and to raise them in the warmer, calm waters of South Australia during their migration season. Less frequently, humpback whales can be seen off the coast.

History

Apollo Bay is part of the traditional lands of the Gadubanud, or King Parrot people, of the Cape Otway coast. By the early 19th century, the area was being frequented by sealers and whalers from Sydney. One local Indigenous name for the area, of uncertain language origin, is 'Krambruk'.

In the 1840s the Henty brothers established a whaling station at Point Bunbury on the western end of the bay. The bay was named by a Captain Loutit in 1845 when he sheltered his vessel, the Apollo, here from a storm.

The first European settlers were timber cutters in the 1850s who subsequently established sawmills. Although the bay provided a relatively sheltered anchorage, the lack of a suitable pier meant that logs were floated out to sea to be loaded on to ships. A township on Apollo Bay was surveyed in 1853 and named Middleton. In the 1860s, farming land was made available and in the mid 1870s, the first blocks in the township were offered for sale. Middleton post office (with a fortnightly mail delivery) opened on 1 May 1873. A school was opened in 1880.

In 1881, the town and post office was renamed Krambruk. That was changed to Apollo Bay in 1898. During this period almost the only access to the area was by sea, but a coach service from Birregurra to Apollo Bay was inaugurated in 1889. The pier at Point Bunbury was swept away in a storm, as was a second pier at that site. Consequently, the "Long Pier" was built at a more sheltered site in 1892.

The town plan indicated that Pascoe Street would be the main thoroughfare, but the erection of several buildings on Collingwood Street meant that it became Apollo Bay's commercial centre. With the upgrade of the road to the town in 1927, and then the completion of the Great Ocean Road in 1932, the area became a tourist destination and an important fishing port.

On 10 July 1932 the coastal steamer Casino sank while attempting to berth at the town jetty. Ten people died. Many earlier shipwrecks had occurred along the Cape Otway coastline.

In 1936 a submarine telegraph and telephone cable from Apollo Bay to Stanley provided the first telephone connection to Tasmania from the mainland. The Apollo Bay Telegraph station closed in 1963 and is now a museum.

Climate
Apollo Bay has an oceanic climate (Cfb) with mild summers and damp winters.

Events and festivals in Apollo Bay
Events and festivals held in Apollo Bay include:
 Winterwild
 Great Ocean Road Running Festival
 Apollo Bay Seafood Festival 
 Apollo Bay and Otway District Show 
 The Apollo Bay Music Festival (first held in 1993 and last held in 2013).  A poster for the festival of 1999 by Jeff Ragus was featured on a postage stamp issued by Australia Post in 2006.

Sport

The Apollo Bay Surf Lifesaving Club was established in 1952 as a result of a meeting held on the foreshore by interested townspeople and Surf Lifesaving Victoria officials. The Apollo Bay SLSC became the ninth club to be affiliated with Surf Lifesaving Victoria. It is now affiliated with the new amalgamation between two Victorian lifesaving organisations: Life Saving Victoria.
The Apollo Bay Sailing Club aims to provide a wide range of opportunities in sailing to a diverse range of abilities and age groups.
Apollo Bay Golf Club is on Nelson Street- (website) and Apollo Bay Pony Club - (website).
The town has an Australian Rules football team competing in the Colac & District Football League.
See also Sports & Recreation on the Apollo Bay Community Website
Apollo Bay has hosted overnight stops on the Great Victorian Bike Ride six times (1991, 1996, 2000, 2004, 2009 and 2016), including serving as the host for the rest day on the last four of those visits.

People born or raised in Apollo Bay

 Neil Melville – an actor born in Sydney, but spent his childhood in Apollo Bay
 Sid O'Neil, Ted O'Neil, Michael Fitzgerald – members of the rock band The Vasco Era
 H. A. Willis – essayist, spent his early childhood in Apollo Bay

References

External links

Apollo Bay - Community Website
Apollo Bay - Official government tourism website.

Towns in Victoria (Australia)
Coastal towns in Victoria (Australia)
Bays of Victoria (Australia)
Otway Ranges
Western District (Victoria)